Alfred Goulet (June 5, 1875 – March 17, 1961) was a Canadian businessman and political figure in Ontario. He represented Russell in the Legislative Assembly of Ontario from 1922 to 1923 and Russell in the House of Commons of Canada from 1925 to 1945 as a Liberal member.

He was born in Wendover, Ontario in 1875, the son of Godfrey Goulet and Maximilienne Boyer, and studied at the University of Ottawa. He married Florendie Sirois in 1896. He owned a general store. Goulet served on the council for Clarence Township and was township reeve. He was elected to the Ontario assembly in a 1922 by-election held after the death of Damase Racine and was elected to the federal parliament in 1925.

References 
 Histoire des Comtes Unis de Prescott et de Russell, L. Brault (1963) 
 Canadian Parliamentary Guide, 1937, AL Normandin

External links 
 

Adresse à Alfred Goulet, Archives Canada

1875 births
1961 deaths
Franco-Ontarian people
Ontario Liberal Party MPPs
Liberal Party of Canada MPs
Members of the House of Commons of Canada from Ontario
People from Clarence-Rockland